Pincham is a surname. Notable people with the surname include:

 R. Eugene Pincham (1925–2008), American attorney and judge 
 Roger Pincham (born 1935), British politician

See also
 Pinkham (disambiguation)